United States gubernatorial elections were held on November 5, 1901, in six states.

Virginia holds its gubernatorial elections in odd numbered years, every 4 years, following the United States presidential election year. New Jersey at this time held gubernatorial elections every 3 years, which it would abandon in 1949. Massachusetts and Rhode Island at this time held gubernatorial elections every year, which they would abandon in 1920 and 1912, respectively. Iowa and Ohio at this time held gubernatorial elections in every odd numbered year.

In Rhode Island, the gubernatorial election was held on the same day as federal elections for the first time, having previously been held in April.

Results

References

Notes

 
November 1901 events